Jürgen Nührenberg (born February 2, 1942, in Berlin) is a German plasma physicist.

He was a post-doctoral student at the University of Iowa and the Courant Institute of Mathematical Sciences of New York University. In 1971, he worked at the Max Planck Institute for Plasma Physics (IPP) in Garching near Munich, where he dealt with the theory of stellarators for controlled nuclear fusion.

In 1979, he became the head of the group "Theorie dreidimensionaler Systeme" (Theory of three-dimensional systems) and in 1981 the head of the group "Stellaratorphysik" (Stellarator Physics). In 1996, he became a scientific member of the IPP. In 1997, he became the Greifswald branch director of the IPP and a professor at the University of Greifswald.

In the 1980s, Nührenberg and Allen Boozer developed methods to optimize the magnetic field of the stellarator in such a way that the stability of plasma confinement became comparable to those of the tokamak. In contrast to tokamaks, stellarators work continuously but have more complicated magnetic fields that do not have simple rotational symmetry. Boozer formulated conditions of stability for the stellarator magnetic fields (including quasi-symmetry) and Nührenberg showed that these could be implemented in concrete magnetic field configurations. These concepts were then experimentally realized in the Wendelstein 7-AS stellarator and later paved the way for the development of the Wendelstein 7-X stellarator in Greifswald. Since 1990, Nührenberg has been a member of the project management team involved in the planning of the Wendelstein 7-X and has played a key role in its development.

In 2010, he received the Hannes Alfvén Prize with Allen Boozer for "the formulation and practical application of criteria allowing stellarators to have good fast-particle and neoclassical energy confinement".

References 

Living people
1942 births
German plasma physicists
University of Göttingen alumni
Ludwig Maximilian University of Munich alumni